Dicki Chhoyang or Dickyi Choeyang, (Mussoorie, India, 1966 -) is a Tibetan politician who was the former Foreign Minister of the Central Tibetan Administration.

Biography 
Dicki Chhoyang was born in Mussoorie, India, in 1966. She immigrated to Canada with her family at 4 years of age. She grew up in Montreal, Quebec in Canada and began working for the Tibetan community at a very young age. Around the age of 20 years, she worked in two key projects.  On the one hand, she participated in the first Canadian documentary on Tibet called A Song for Tibet made by the National Film Board of Canada, and secondly to the US-Tibetan resettlement project in the United States. She was a local coordinator and helped 21 Tibetans relocate in Connecticut. At the age of 27, she studied and worked 10 years in Tibet and China. In December 1999, at Indiana University, MA, she got a degree in Central Eurasian studies. In 2006, she also obtained a M.Sc. from the University of Guelph.

Candidate for election in 2011, she was elected the Electorate of North America becoming Deputy of the 15th Assembly Tibetan Parliament in exile. In September 2011, she was replaced by Tashi Namgyal Khamsitsang when she was appointed Minister of Foreign Affairs of the 14th Tibetan Kashag.  she resigned from her post on 28 February 2016.

In February 2020, she was appointed as the Interim Director for McGill University's Indigenous Initiatives.

Publications 
 Dicki Tsomo Chhoyang, Tibetan-medium higher education in Qinghai, Indiana University, 1999
 Dicki Tsomo Chhoyang, In Search of the Iron Rice Bowl: A Case Study of Tibetan Rural Household Investment in Higher Education as a Livelihood Strategy, University of Guelph, 2006

See also

List of foreign ministers in 2017 
Foreign relations of Tibet

References

External links 

 Web site of Dicki Chhoyang

 

People from Mussoorie
Members of the Parliament of the Central Tibetan Administration
Female foreign ministers
Foreign ministers of Tibet
1966 births
Living people
Tibetan activists
Tibetan women in politics
Tibetan academics
Indiana University Bloomington alumni
University of Guelph alumni
Tibetan–French translators
Canadian people of Tibetan descent
Academic staff of McGill University